John Montgomery (fl. 1388) was an English politician.

He was a Member (MP) of the Parliament of England for Leominster in February 1388. He is unidentified.

References

English MPs February 1388
People from Sussex